The Lübeck Cougars are an American football team from Lübeck, Germany.

The club had its greatest success in 2012 when it played in the German Football League for a season.

History
The club was formed in 1987 out of the members of an earlier American football club in Lübeck, the Outlaws, which went defunct the year before.

The Cougars entered league football in 1990, playing in Landesliga Nord for a season before earning promotion to the Regionalliga Nord. After three seasons in the Regionalliga the club was promoted to the 2. American football Bundesliga, now the German Football League 2 but lasted for only one season before returning to the Regionalliga. 

The next seven seasons the Cougars played either in the Regionalliga or the Oberliga below before making a return to the 2. Bundesliga in 2001. The club played nine seasons in this league, renamed to GFL 2 at the end of the 2007 season and was finally promoted to the German Football League in 2011 when the Mönchengladbach Mavericks folded in the off-season and an additional place in the league became available.

The Cougars lasted for only one season at the highest level, coming last in the league and losing in the promotion/relegation round to the Cologne Falcons. Back in the GFL 2 the club came only fifth in 2013 but improved in 2014, finishing second, its best-ever finish in the league. It repeated this result in 2015.

Honours
 GFL
 League membership: 2012

Recent seasons
Recent seasons of the Cougars:

 PR/RR = Promotion/relegation round.
 QF = Quarter finals.
 SF = Semi finals.
 GB = German Bowl.

References

External links
  Official website
  German Football League official website
  Football History Historic American football tables from Germany

German Football League teams
American football teams in Germany
American football teams established in 1987
1987 establishments in West Germany
Sport in Lübeck